Ikryanoye (Ikrıan) is a rural locality (a selo) and the administrative center of Ikryaninsky District of Astrakhan Oblast, Russia. Population:

References

Notes

Sources

Rural localities in Ikryaninsky District